South Hampshire (formally the Southern division of Hampshire) was a parliamentary constituency in the county of Hampshire, which returned two Members of Parliament (MPs) to the House of Commons of the Parliament of the United Kingdom, elected by the bloc vote system.

It was created under the Great Reform Act for the 1832 general election, and abolished by the Redistribution of Seats Act 1885 for the 1885 general election.

Boundaries
1832–1885: The Petty Sessional Divisions of Fareham, Lymington, Ringwood, Romsey and Southampton, and the Town and County of the Town of Southampton.

Members of Parliament

Election results

Elections in the 1830s

Elections in the 1840s

Fleming resigned by accepting the office of Steward of the Chiltern Hundreds, causing a by-election.

Elections in the 1850s

Elections in the 1860s

Elections in the 1870s

Elections in the 1880s

Douglas-Scott-Montagu resigned, causing a by-election.

Sources

Notes and references 

Parliamentary constituencies in Hampshire (historic)
Constituencies of the Parliament of the United Kingdom established in 1832
Constituencies of the Parliament of the United Kingdom disestablished in 1885